Sergiu Chircă is a Moldovan politician.

Biography 

He served as member of the Parliament of Moldova and is a leader of the Democratic Forum of Romanians in Moldova.

External links 
 Cine au fost şi ce fac deputaţii primului Parlament din R. Moldova (1990-1994)?
 Declaraţia deputaţilor din primul Parlament
 Site-ul Parlamentului Republicii Moldova

References

Living people
Moldovan MPs 1990–1994
Popular Front of Moldova MPs
Members of the Commission for the Study of the Communist Dictatorship in Moldova
Year of birth missing (living people)